The 2022 Silverstone FIA Formula 2 round was a motor racing event held between 1 and 3 July 2022 at Silverstone Circuit, Silverstone, United Kingdom. It was the seventh round of the 2022 FIA Formula 2 Championship and was held in support of the 2022 British Grand Prix.

Driver changes 
After collecting a total of 12 penalty points, Amaury Cordeel was suspended for the Silverstone round and was replaced by David Beckmann. It was the first time in Formula 2 since 2019 that a driver was suspended for an entire weekend, following Mahaveer Raghunathan's ban in the 2019 Spielberg Formula 2 round due to repeatedly erratic driving.

Classification

Qualifying
Logan Sargeant took his maiden Formula 2 pole position, which was the first for Carlin since Yuki Tsunoda's pole at the 2020 Sakhir Grand Prix. Sargeant qualified ahead of Frederik Vesti and championship leader Felipe Drugovich, who set the same time as championship rival Théo Pourchaire. Drugovich was given precedence, as he set the lap time first.

Notes:
 – Despite qualifying in seventeenth place, Ralph Boschung later withdrew from the remainder of the weekend due to the effects of a neck injury sustained at the third round in Imola. All remaining drivers behind Boschung were promoted each one place at the starting grid.

Sprint race 

Notes:
 – Roy Nissany has been handed a three-place grid penalty for causing a collision with Cem Bölükbaşı at the previous round in Baku.

Feature race

Standings after the event 

Drivers' Championship standings

Teams' Championship standings

 Note: Only the top five positions are included for both sets of standings.

See also 
 2022 British Grand Prix
 2022 Silverstone Formula 3 round

References

External links 
 Official website

|- style="text-align:center"
|width="35%"|Previous race:
|width="30%"|FIA Formula 2 Championship2022 season
|width="40%"|Next race:

Silverstone
SIlverstone Formula 2
Silverstone Formula 2